Jason Mooney (born 5 June 1973) is a former Australian rules footballer who played with the Sydney and Geelong Football Clubs in the Australian Football League (AFL).

Mooney made his debut for Sydney in 1992 and played mostly as a defender and in the ruck. He played an important part in Sydney's 1996 Finals campaign, kicking three goals in their six point Qualifying Final win over Hawthorn in the absence of star forward Tony Lockett. He was used as a centre half-forward in the 1996 Grand Final but finished on the losing team.

In the 1998 AFL Draft he was traded to Geelong and kicked 33 goals in his debut season, finishing just one goal short of topping their goalkicking that year. His tally included a career best bag of five against Essendon in Round 11.

He is the older brother of Geelong premiership player Cameron Mooney and played alongside him in 2000 and 2001. His career was plagued by knee injuries and it ended his AFL career in 2001.

References

1973 births
Living people
Australian rules footballers from New South Wales
Sydney Swans players
Geelong Football Club players
Allies State of Origin players
Sportspeople from Wagga Wagga